Moorgate is a central London railway terminus and connected London Underground station on Moorgate in the City of London. Main line railway services for Hertford, Welwyn Garden City and Stevenage are operated by Great Northern, while the Underground station is served by the Circle, Hammersmith & City, Metropolitan and Northern lines.

The station was opened as Moorgate Street in 1865 by the Metropolitan Railway. In 1900, the City & South London Railway added the station to its network, and the Great Northern & City Railway began serving the station in 1904. In 1975, the Northern City Line platforms were the site of the Moorgate tube crash – at the time, the worst peacetime accident in the history of the London Underground – in which 43 people were killed.

Location and station layout

The station has entrances on both Moorgate itself and Moorfields, which runs parallel. The public entrances from the street give access to all the train services at the station, there are three distinct levels.

The Circle, Hammersmith & City and Metropolitan underground lines use platforms 1 and 2, which are through platforms. For terminating trains at busy times, there are platforms 3 and 4 which are west-facing bays. Adjacent to these are platforms 5 and 6 of the former Thameslink trains service from  via St Pancras. These are disused following the closure of the Moorgate branch from Farringdon junction as part of the Thameslink Programme and are now used for storage.

The Northern line of the Underground uses platforms 7 and 8, which are in a deep-level tube section of the station. National Rail services on the Northern City Line use platforms 9 and 10, which are terminal platforms. Train services run via the East Coast Main Line to Welwyn Garden City, and to Hertford North, Stevenage. Because of this, Moorgate is part of the London station group and accepts tickets marked "London Terminals".

London Buses routes 21, 43, 76, 100, 141 and 153 serve the station.

History

1861–1950

Parliamentary power had been obtained to build a station at Moorgate in 1861, two years before the initial section, and it was completed on 23 December 1865. Increased traffic from other companies, including goods traffic from the Great Northern Railway, led to the line between King's Cross and Moorgate being widened to four tracks; the route was called the City Widened Lines and included a new tunnel at Clerkenwell which was  lower than the original. The Widened Lines were open from Moorgate to Farringdon on 1 July 1866, and to King's Cross on 17 February 1868. Suburban services from the Midland Railway ran via Kentish Town and the Great Northern Railway ran via King's Cross. In 1874, director of the Metropolitan, Edward Watkin, described Moorgate Street as "your great terminus" and recommended a 100-bedroom hotel should be built on top of the station.

An act for the extension had been authorised in 1893 and included an eastern diversion of the original line underneath the Thames. The new station opened on 25 February 1900. The line was extended to Angel on 17 November the following year.

It had an escalator connection to the other Moorgate platforms. The route was constructed in tube tunnels, but they were constructed at a diameter capable of accommodating main-line trains (in contrast to the majority of London tube tunnels which are much smaller). The line was the first to use automatic signalling throughout its length without any moving parts. Though a popular route, it went into decline after the Metropolitan Railway purchased the route on 1 July 1913. Consequently, the planned through services to the Great Northern Railway's main line were never implemented.

The section from Moorgate to Clapham Common was worked on during the night while daytime services remained running, but closed completely on 28 November 1923 following a roof collapse at Newington Causeway the day before. Services to Clapham Common resumed on 1 December. The station was renamed from Moorgate Street to Moorgate on 24 October that year.

1950 – present

British Rail services to Moorgate were initially steam-operated. A commemorative service ran on 6 June 1971 from Moorgate to the depot at Neasden, powered by a 0-6-0 tank locomotive. Steam was replaced by Cravens-built diesel multiple units and British Rail Class 31 locomotives class hauling non-corridor stock which remained in operation until 1976, when it was replaced with British Rail Class 313 electrics.

The Northern City Line connection for Moorgate to Finsbury Park tube was closed beyond Drayton Park on 5 October 1964 to allow work on the Victoria line. The line never re-opened fully, but instead the line was connected to the Finsbury Park British Rail station, in order to provide a connection for suburban services into Moorgate. The new service opened on 1 September 1968.

Moorgate station was completely modernised at platform level and street level in the 1960s, and the Widened Lines part of the station was extended to six platforms.

British Rail (Eastern Region) took over control of the Northern City Line from London Underground in 1975, as part of the Great Northern lines suburban electrification. The Highbury Branch of the Northern line was terminated. Services from Finsbury Park to Moorgate were diverted to the Northern City Line from the City Widened Lines the following year. The City Widened Lines were renamed the Moorgate line when overhead electrification was installed in 1982, allowing the Midland City Line service to run from Bedford via the Midland Main Line to Moorgate on the Thameslink service.

The Moorgate Thameslink branch was reduced to peak hours services only in 2003, and closed permanently on 20 March 2009 as part of the Thameslink Programme upgrades. The closure was required in order to lengthen the platforms at Farringdon to take the longer-carriage trains, which could only be done southward in the direction of Moorgate as there was too steep a gradient to the north.

Under Crossrail works, the western ticket hall of the scheme's  station will be situated just east of Moorgate station. This linked the Northern line platforms at Moorgate to the Central line at Liverpool Street via the Elizabeth line platforms spanning the two.

The refurbished entrance on Moorfields opened on 5 July 2021. This provides step-free access to Circle, Elizabeth, Metropolitan and Hammersmith and City line platforms.

Accidents and incidents

On 13 September 1905, a train derailed at the station. There were two injuries.

On 28 February 1975, 43 people were killed and 74 seriously injured in the Moorgate tube crash, when a southbound Northern City Line train crashed into the end of the dead-end tunnel beyond the platform. The accident caused the most fatalities on the Underground during peacetime and has been considered the worst ever on the system. The cause was the unexplained failure of the driver to stop or even slow down at the platform, causing the train to run at speed into the dead-end tunnel, colliding with the buffers and then with the wall. Services were immediately suspended, resuming on 1 March from Drayton Park to Old Street only. The wreckage was not fully cleared until 6 March and the station fully re-opened four days later.

Infrastructure
Trains using the deep level Northern City Line platforms (9 and 10) are supplied with 750 V DC current via the third rail, overseen by York Electrical Control Room. The signalling is track circuit block, colour light signals with TPWS, the tripcock mechanisms having been removed in May 2022, controlled by York Rail Operating Centre.

The former subsurface Thameslink bay platforms (5 and 6) were equipped with 25 kilovolt alternating current overhead line equipment, overseen by York Electrical Control Room. Signalling was track circuit block, multiple aspect colour light signals, controlled by West Hampstead PSB.

South of the Northern City platform 10 is a Greathead tunnelling shield. The shield was used to dig part of a very short planned extension south to Lothbury, quickly abandoned.

Services

London Underground
The Metropolitan, Hammersmith & City and Circle lines serve the station between Barbican to the west and Liverpool Street to the east. All three lines share the same pair of tracks from Baker Street Junction to Aldgate Junction.

Circle line
The typical service in trains per hour (tph) is:
 6 tph Clockwise via Liverpool Street and Tower Hill
 6 tph Anti-Clockwise via Kings Cross St Pancras and Paddington

Hammersmith and City line
The typical service in trains per hour (tph) is:
 6 tph Eastbound to Barking
 6 tph Westbound to Hammersmith via Paddington

Metropolitan line
The Metropolitan Line is the only line to operate express services from Moorgate, and then only at peak times. Fast services run non-stop between Wembley Park,  and Moor Park; semi-fast services run non-stop between Wembley Park and Harrow-on-the-Hill.

The typical off-peak service in trains per hour (tph) is:
 12 tph Eastbound to Aldgate
 2 tph Westbound to Amersham (all stations)
 2 tph Westbound to Chesham (all stations)
 8 tph Westbound to Uxbridge (all stations)
Off-peak services to/from Watford terminate at Baker Street

The typical peak time service in trains per hour (tph) is:
 14 tph Eastbound to Aldgate
 2 tph Westbound to Amersham (fast in the evening peak only)
 2 tph Westbound to Chesham (fast in the evening peak only)
 4 tph Westbound to Watford (semi-fast in the evening peak only)
 6 tph Westbound to Uxbridge (all stations)

Northern line
The Northern line serves the station between Old Street to the north and Bank to the south being part of the City branch of the Northern line via Bank.

The typical off-peak service in trains per hour (tph) are:
10 tph Northbound to Edgware
10 tph Northbound to High Barnet
20 tph Southbound to Morden

The typical peak time service in trains per hour (tph) are:
12 tph Northbound to Edgware
12 tph Northbound to High Barnet
24 tph Southbound to Morden

Previously, typical off-peak services include terminating at Colindale to the north and Tooting Broadway to the south.

National Rail

Northern City Line
The Northern City Line, formerly part of the London Underground as self-contained tube line between Moorgate and Finsbury Park that was operated as part as a branch of the Northern line, is part of the Great Northern Route (itself part of the East Coast Main Line). Typical services at Moorgate off-peak Monday-Friday (all operated by Great Northern):
2 tph to Welwyn Garden City via Potters Bar
2 tph to Stevenage via Hertford North
During Peak Hours, there are 4 tph to Welwyn Garden City, as well as an additional 2 tph that terminate at Gordon Hill and 2 tph that terminate at Hertford North.

Great Northern introduced a weekend service from 13 December 2015.

References

Citations

Sources

External links

 Moorgate station building in 1915.

Circle line (London Underground) stations
Hammersmith & City line stations
Metropolitan line stations
Northern line stations
Tube stations in the City of London
Railway stations in the City of London
Railway termini in London
Former Metropolitan Railway stations
Railway stations in Great Britain opened in 1865
Former City and South London Railway stations
Railway stations in Great Britain opened in 1900
Former Great Northern and City Railway stations
Railway stations in Great Britain opened in 1904
Railway stations in Great Britain closed in 1975
Railway stations in Great Britain opened in 1976
Barbican Estate
Unopened Northern Heights extension stations
Railway stations located underground in the United Kingdom
London station group
Railway stations served by Govia Thameslink Railway